Trichostasis spinulosa is a common but rarely diagnosed disorder of the hair follicles that clinically gives the impression of blackheads, but the follicles are filled with funnel-shaped, horny plugs that are bundles of vellus hairs.

Diagnosis 
Standard skin surface biopsy (SSSB) is a noninvasive method used for diagnosis.

Treatment

See also 
 List of cutaneous conditions

References

Conditions of the skin appendages